The Young German Order (in German , often abbreviated as ) was a large para-military organisation in Weimar Germany. Its name and symbol (see picture) were inspired by the Teutonic Knights ( in German).

The pseudo-chivalric group was involved in nationalistic German politics. Its youth organisation was called  (Young German Youth).

The group was founded by Artur Mahraun in May 1920 in Kassel. The organisation tried to revive ideals of the pre-war Wandervogel youth movement. Very soon it reached 70,000 members, although it was temporarily banned in early 1921, and being the largest of the many para-military groups in the 1920s, it later expanded to almost 300,000 members. In 1933 it was banned by the Nazi rulers.

Paramilitary organisations of the Weimar Republic
Conservative Revolutionary movement
German nationalist organizations